The Columbus mayoral election of 1907 was the 56th mayoral election in Columbus, Ohio.   It was held on Tuesday, November 5, 1907.  Republican party nominee Charles A. Bond defeated Judge and Democratic party nominee Thomas A. Duncan.

References

Bibliography

Mayoral elections in Columbus, Ohio
1907 Ohio elections
Columbus